Professor Xing Ruan 阮昕 is a Chinese-Australian academic, architect and author. He is currently Dean and Guangqi Chair Professor of Architecture at School of Design, Shanghai Jiao Tong University. His work focuses on Asia's architecture and urbanization against the background of Western discourse, and on architecture as a representation of humanity.

Early life and education 
Born in Kunming, China, Ruan received a Bachelor of Architecture and Master of Architecture at Southeast University, Nanjing (1982 – 1989), and received a PhD at Victoria University of Wellington (1991 – 1996).

Academic career 
Ruan started his academic teaching career in 1995, at Curtin University, Western Australia. He held positions as a Lecturer, Senior Lecturer, and associate professor of Architecture until 2001. In 2002, Ruan joined the University of Technology Sydney (UTS) as Head of the School of Architecture. In 2004 he became Professor of Architecture at the University of New South Wales (UNSW). Ruan held a number of roles while at UNSW, including Chair of Architecture Discipline and Director of Master of Architecture (2005 – 2009), Director of Architecture (2014 – 2016), and Associate Dean at the Faculty of the Built Environment (2015 – 2018).

He has been Dean and Guangqi Chair Professor of Architecture at School of Design, Shanghai Jiao Tong University since July 2018.

Publishing career 
Ruan has written and published seven books.

He is co-editor, with Ronald Knapp, of the book series Spatial Habitus: Making and Meaning in Asia’s Architecture, published by the University of Hawai’i Press. Subjects of the series included China, Japan, Korea, India, and the Middle East.

In November 2021, Bloomsbury published Confucius’ Courtyard: Architecture, Philosophy, and the Good Life in China, distributed in the US, UK, Australia and New Zealand.

Ruan has authored essays and criticism on architecture and society for academic journals and mainstream media including the Journal of the Society of Architectural Historians (JSAH), The Conversation, Quartz, Architecture Australia and Architecture Now.

In China, his essays have been published in Jianzhu Xuebao [Architectural Journal 建筑学报], Jianzhu Shi [The Architect 建筑师] and Wenhui Xueren of Wenhui Ribao [Wenhui Scholar of Wenhui Daily 文汇学人， 文汇日报].

He has been interviewed about his work by ABC Radio National, Times Radio, Barron's Magazine and ArchDaily.

Public lectures and events 
Ruan has delivered public lectures for the Royal Institute of British Architects (RIBA), The Chinese University of Hong Kong (CUHK), the National University of Singapore (NUS), Politecnico di Milano, CEPT and the University of Bath.

In 2019, Ruan was the architectural curator of the Shanghai Urban Space Art Season (SUSAS) biennale.

Bibliography 

 Confucius’ Courtyard: Architecture, Philosophy, and the Good Life in China – Bloomsbury, 2021
 Fusheng Jianzhu [Floating Life and Architecture 浮生·建筑] – The Commercial Press, 2020
 Hand & Mind: Conversations on Architecture and the Built World (editor) – The University of New South Wales Press, 2019
 Spatial Habitus: Making and Meaning in Asia’s Architecture (series) – The University of Hawai‘i Press, 2007
 Allegorical Architecture: Living Myth and Architectonics in Southern China – The University of Hawai‘i Press, 2006 
 Skyplane (co-editor) – University of New South Wales Press, 2009
 Topophilia and Topophobia: Reflections on Twentieth-century Human Habitat – Routledge, 2007 
 New China Architecture – Periplus/Tuttle, 2006

References 

1965 births
Living people